Yes, It's the Cathode-Ray Tube Show! was a British television comedy programme which aired on ITV during 1957. It was produced by Associated-Rediffusion Television. Cast included Peter Sellers, Michael Bentine, David Nettheim, and June Whitfield. Of the six episodes produced, only one episode is known to survive.

References

External links
 Yes, It's the Cathode-Ray Tube Show! on IMDb

1957 British television series debuts
1957 British television series endings
English-language television shows
1950s British comedy television series
Black-and-white British television shows
ITV comedy